Dmytro Leonidovych Cherniavskyi is the advisor to the Ukrainian Minister of Family, Youth, and Sport.

Early life and education
He was born  on July 16, 1971, in Donetsk. His father was Leonid Vladimirowich Cherniavskiy; his mother, Zhanna Vasyliivna Cherniavska, both citizens of Ukraine. He entered school in Donetsk in 1978, and finished school in 1986. He then entered the State Institute of Donetsk on 1991, graduating in 1997. In 1998, he enter law school at the National Taras Shevchenko University of Kiev, and graduated in 2000.

He is married to wife Maria Vladimirovna and has two children, Gleb and Gabriel.

Employment
From August 1996 to December 1998, he worked as an interpreter in a real estate and investment company. From  January 1999 to July 2002, he was employed at Cherniavskiy and Partners. From August 2002 to April 2008, he worked as a legal councillor.

In 2003, he became the vice-president of the Eastern European division of Tax Consulting U.K. From 2003 to 2004, he was a chairman of board of a Russian subsidiary of UkrSibbank. From 2004 until 2008, he was a member of the committee of directors of corporation Aurora.

On May 13, 2008, he was appointed as advisor to the Minister of Family, Youth, and Sport. On October 7, 2008, he was appointed alternate director general of the government enterprise  NSK Olimpiyskiy and led the organizational management for preparation of the stadium for the EURO 2012.

External links
 Ministry of Ukraine for family, youth and sport
 Biography on website of Cabinet council of Ukraine

1971 births
Living people
Businesspeople from Donetsk
Politicians from Donetsk
Donetsk National University alumni